Lake Carnegie is a large ephemeral lake in the Shire of Wiluna in the Goldfields-Esperance region of Western Australia. The lake is named after David Carnegie, who explored much of inland Western Australia in the 1890s. A similar lake lies to its south east - Lake Wells.

Description
Lake Carnegie is predominantly surrounded by desert environments. It lies east of Wiluna, at the southern edge of the Little Sandy Desert, and at the southwestern border of the Gibson Desert. It is northeast of Leonora and northwest of the Great Central Road and the Great Victoria Desert. Lake Carnegie is north of the main region of gold fields in Western Australia.<ref>Western Australia. Dept. of Mines.
Title 	[Portion of Western Australian goldfields]. Litho. no. 114. Sheet 3 [cartographic material][Perth, W.A. : Dept. of Mines?], 1906.Notes 	Shows roads, tracks, stock routes, railroads, topography and mining area boundaries. Relief shown by hachures and spot heights.1.10.06" Covers in the East from Doolgunna south to Lakes Barlee and Giles to a western line from Lake Carnegie south to Edjudina Soak. Held in Battye Library</ref>

Lake Carnegie fills with water only during very rare periods of significant rainfall, such as during the huge 1900 floods, and in numerous recent tropical wet seasons when climate change has moved the monsoon and tropical cyclones south. In dry years, it is reduced to a muddy marsh.

In 1973 Tropical Cyclone Kerry crossed the northwest coast and moved southwest as far as the northern gold fields. The runoff was enormous, causing widespread flooding, with the lake overflowing and leaving the area between Carnegie and Wiluna "one huge lake".

Water entering the lake, unlike in more easterly playas of the Australian arid zone, does not come from well-defined river channels. The soils of the region are so weathered – lacking tectonic or glacial activity since the Carboniferous ice ages – that sediment is completely absent; the terrain is so flat that only the rocks most impervious to weathering remain on the surface. Well-defined river channels cannot form, especially since the extreme age of the soils and consequent high rooting density of native flora limit runoff to an extreme degree.

Pastoral leases
The lake area is bounded by Windidda, Yelma, Wongawel, Niminga, Carnegie and Prenti Downs pastoral leases, otherwise known in Western Australia as stations''.

Gallery

See also

 List of lakes of Western Australia

References

Carnegie
Carnegie